The Vision of Saint Alphonsus Rodriguez is a 1630 painting by Francisco de Zurbarán, now in the Real Academia de Bellas Artes de San Fernando in Madrid. It shows a vision of Jesuit Saint Alphonsus Rodriguez.

References

1630 paintings
Paintings in the collection of the Real Academia de Bellas Artes de San Fernando
Alphonsus Rodriguez
Paintings by Francisco de Zurbarán
Paintings depicting Jesus
Angels in art
Paintings of the Virgin Mary
Musical instruments in art